Willie Sims may refer to:

 Willie Sims (footballer) (born 1984), Guatemalan soccer player
 Willie Sims (basketball) (born 1958), American-Israeli retired basketball player

See also
Willie Simms (1870–1927), American thoroughbred horse racing jockey
William Sims (disambiguation)